William F. Russell (c.1805 – after 1875) was a Florida settler, soldier, and member of the Florida House of Representatives, serving as Speaker of the House in 1854. Russell was born in North Carolina. He became a major, and was put in charge of the Indian River Settlement in St. Lucia County, which broke up following an attack by Seminole Indians in July 1849.  Russell was shot in the arm during the attack. Russell's brother-in-law John Barker was killed, but the rest of his family escaped to New Smyrna.

He served as county commissioner for St. Lucie County from 1847 to 1852 and 1853 until Brevard County was broken off from St. Lucie in 1855.

In 1854, Russell was elected to the Florida House of Representatives and served as Speaker of the Florida House of Representatives.

Russell introduced the legislation creating Brevard County, and naming it after his friend Theodorus W. Brevard in 1855

Russell-Padrick House 

Around 1875 Russell built a two-story house in St. Lucie County. It is the oldest standing house in the county and is now known as the Russell-Padrick House, part of the St. Lucie Village Historic District. It is located at 2817 North Indian River Drive.

References

Sources
 
 
 

1805 births
County commissioners in Florida
Customs officials
Florida pioneers
Speakers of the Florida House of Representatives
People from North Carolina
People from St. Lucie County, Florida
People from Brevard County, Florida
Date of birth unknown
Year of death missing
Place of death missing